Phyteia was a town of ancient Phrygia, inhabited during Byzantine times. 

Its site is located near Kemerkaya in Asiatic Turkey.

References

Populated places in Phrygia
Former populated places in Turkey
Populated places of the Byzantine Empire
History of Afyonkarahisar Province
Bolvadin District